Serenate per 16 bionde ("Serenades for 16 blondes") is a 1957 Italian musical comedy film written and directed by Marino Girolami and starring Claudio Villa.

Plot

Cast 

 Claudio Villa as Claudio 
  Esther Masing as Isabella 
  Simone Balmaine as  Jeannette 
 Wandisa Guida as  Cristine 
 Mario Riva as  Peppe
 Riccardo Billi as Pippo 
 Carlo Sposito as  Raimondo 
 Carlo Delle Piane as  Mario 
  Diana Rabito as  Paulette 
 Toni Ucci as  Paolo
 Enzo Garinei as  Ugo 
 Pina Gallini as Corinne 
  Loretta Capitoli as Odette 
 Bibi Martellotti as Jacqueline 
 Loris Gizzi as Camillo Triglia 
  Giorgio Gandos as Buona Fortuna 
 Silvio Bagolini 
 Anna Campori

References

External links

Serenate per 16 bionde at Variety Distribution

1957 musical comedy films
1957 films
Italian musical comedy films
Films directed by Marino Girolami
Films with screenplays by Marino Girolami
Italian black-and-white films
1950s Italian films